John Baptist Bergh (October 8, 1857April 17, 1883) was an American professional baseball player from Boston, Massachusetts.  He played one game in the outfield for the  Philadelphia Athletics and 11 games as a catcher for the  Boston Red Caps.  He died in his hometown of Boston at the age of 25 of consumption, and is interred at Holyhood Cemetery in Brookline, Massachusetts.

References

External links
Baseball Reference.com page

Major League Baseball catchers
Philadelphia Athletics (NL) players
Boston Red Caps players
Baseball players from Boston
1857 births
1883 deaths
19th-century baseball players
19th-century deaths from tuberculosis
Burials at Holyhood Cemetery (Brookline)
Tuberculosis deaths in Massachusetts